Joseph Patrick Schaefer (December 21, 1924 – December 27, 2000) was an American professional ice hockey goaltender. He was born in Long Island, New York, and played in two games for the New York Rangers.

External links

1924 births
2000 deaths
Ice hockey players from New York (state)
Johnstown Jets players
New York Rangers players
American men's ice hockey goaltenders